The Electoral district of Villiers and Heytesbury was one of the original sixteen electoral districts of the old unicameral Victorian Legislative Council of 1851 to 1856. Victoria being a colony in Australia at the time.

The district was located in western Victoria and included the counties of Villiers and Heytesbury, covering the area from Lake Corangamite along the coast westward past Port Fairy.

From 1856 onwards, the Victorian parliament consisted of two houses, the Victorian Legislative Council (upper house, consisting of Provinces) and the Victorian Legislative Assembly (lower house).

Members
One member initially, two from 1853.

 = resigned
 = by-election

Rutledge later represented Villiers and Heytesbury in the Victorian Legislative Assembly from November 1856.
Forlonge later represented The Murray in the Victorian Legislative Assembly from January 1858.

See also
 Parliaments of the Australian states and territories
 List of members of the Victorian Legislative Council

References

Former electoral districts of Victorian Legislative Council
1851 establishments in Australia
1856 disestablishments in Australia